Roessler is a surname. Notable people with the surname include:
 Carol Roessler (born 1948), American politician
 Henri Roessler (1910–1978), French football player and manager
 Kira Roessler (born 1962), American bass guitarist, singer and Emmy award-winning dialogue editor
 Oscar F. Roessler (1860-1932), American politician
 Pat Roessler, American baseball coach
 Paul Roessler (born 1958), American punk rock musician
 Rudolf Roessler (1897–1958), German spy for the Soviet Union

See also
 Rößler
 Rössler
 Roeseler
 Bridgeport Roesslers